An aloo pie is a fried dumpling popular in the cuisine of Trinidad and Tobago. It is a soft, fried pastry made from flour and water, and filled with boiled, spiced and mashed potatoes (aloo being the Hindi word for "potato") and other vegetables like green peas or chana dal (split chickpeas without their seedcoat).

References

Indian cuisine outside India
Potato dishes
Savoury pies
Trinidad and Tobago cuisine